WPIP (880 AM) is a radio station broadcasting a religious format. It is licensed to Winston-Salem, North Carolina, United States, and serves the Piedmont Triad area of North Carolina.  The station, owned by Berean Christian School (North Carolina) which is part of Berean Baptist Church, broadcasts only during daytime hours to protect WCBS (AM) of New York City, which is assigned the 880 AM clear channel frequency during the nighttime.

References

External links
 

PIP
Radio stations established in 1995
1995 establishments in North Carolina
PIP
PIP